Cortez Zell Gray (March 7, 1916 – July 28, 1996) was an American professional basketball player. He played for the Toledo Jim White Chevrolets in the National Basketball League for four games during the first half of the 1942–43 season and averaged 4.5 points per game. He was the brother of Wyndol Gray, another professional basketball player.

References

1916 births
1996 deaths
American men's basketball players
Basketball players from Akron, Ohio
Centers (basketball)
Forwards (basketball)
Toledo Jim White Chevrolets players
Toledo Rockets men's basketball players